Globidrillia strohbeeni is a species of sea snail, a marine gastropod mollusk in the family Drilliidae.

Description
The size of an adult shell varies between 8 mm and 12 mm.

Distribution
This species occurs in the demersal zone of the Eastern Pacific off the Baja California peninsula.

References

External links
 
  Tucker, J.K. 2004 Catalog of recent and fossil turrids (Mollusca: Gastropoda). Zootaxa 682:1–1295

strohbeeni
Gastropods described in 1951